The Wildlife Trust for Bedfordshire, Cambridgeshire and Northamptonshire (WTBCN) is a registered charity which manages 126 nature reserves covering . It has over 35,000 members, and 95% of people in Bedfordshire, Cambridgeshire and Northamptonshire live within five miles of a reserve. In the year to 31 March 2016 it employed 105 people and had an income of £5.1 million. It aims to conserve wildlife, inspire people to take action for wildlife, offer advice and share knowledge. The WTBCN is one of 36 wildlife trusts covering England, and 46 covering the whole of the United Kingdom.

In 1912 Charles Rothschild formed the Society for the Promotion of Nature Reserves to protect sites considered "worthy of preservation". The society worked to secure statutory protection, and this began with the National Parks and Access to the Countryside Act 1949. In 1959 the society took on a coordinating role for local wildlife trusts, which covered the whole of Britain and Northern Ireland by 1978. The society changed its name to the Royal Society of Wildlife Trusts in 2004, and it operates as The Wildlife Trusts.

In 1956 the Cambridgeshire and Isle of Ely Naturalists’ Trust was founded, and it was followed by the Bedfordshire and Huntingdonshire Wildlife Trust in 1961, the Northamptonshire Wildlife Trust in 1963, and the Peterborough Wildlife Group in 1987. The Bedfordshire and Cambridgeshire trusts merged in 1990, and a further merger produced the Wildlife Trust for Bedfordshire, Cambridgeshire and Northamptonshire and Peterborough in 1994. Peterborough was dropped from the name (but still covered by the trust) in 2011.

Fifty-two reserves are Sites of Special Scientific Interest (SSSI), six are Ramsar wetland sites of international importance, six are Special Protection Areas under the European Union Directive on the Conservation of Wild Birds, two are national nature reserves, four are Nature Conservation Review sites, one is a Special Area of Conservation, two are in the Chilterns Area of Outstanding Natural Beauty, one is a Geological Conservation Review site and eighteen are local nature reserves.

Nature reserves

Key

Designations
CAONB = Chilterns Area of Outstanding Natural Beauty
GCR = Geological Conservation Review
LNR = Local nature reserve
NCR = Nature Conservation Review
NNR = National nature reserve
Ramsar = Ramsar wetland site of international importance
SAC = Special Area of Conservation

SPA = Special Protection Area under the European Union Directive on the Conservation of Wild Birds
SSSI = Site of Special Scientific Interest

Public access
NO = No public access
PP = Public access to part of the site
WTPR = Wildlife Trust permit required for access
YES = Public access to all or most of the site

Bedfordshire reserves

Cambridgeshire reserves

Northamptonshire reserves

See also
Warren Villas

Notes

References

Bibliography

External links
Wildlife Trust for Bedfordshire, Cambridgeshire and Northamptonshire website

Environment of Bedfordshire
Environment of Cambridgeshire
Environment of Northamptonshire
Wildlife Trusts of England